"La Reina de la Noche" (The Queen of the Night) is a dance-pop song by Venezuelan singer Mayré Martínez and the first single from her studio album of the same name, it was released on her official website on May 25, 2008.

Song information
The song is the first track from Martínez since she parted ways with previous label Sony BMG. It was written by William Luque (responsible for Menudo's and Chenoa's songs), produced by Jesús Sanchez, and it samples Mozart's opera The Magic Flute. The lyrics and music are also partly based on the character The Queen of the Night from the same opera, and it marks a change from Mayre's typical pop ballad and tropical songs to a futuristic dance style.

In reference to the new album and the first single, Mayré Martinez said:

Promotion
During the month of July, Martínez was a guest in two Globovisión shows – the just-for-teenagers news show Emisión Juvenil, and the late night talk show Sábado en la Noche, where she commented about her status with the new single and the upcoming album. She also performed live in a mall in Barquisimeto, Venezuela. During August she performed the song in the charity concert "Corazones por la Vida" in Caracas, and also in the Miss Venezuela 2008 preliminary contest called "La Gala de la Belleza", which aired live in Venevisión on August 30.

The music video, produced by her own production company Mayré Martínez Producciones, was released on September 15, 2008, showing Mayre singing dressed both in a large black dress and as a construction worker.

Charts

References

External links
 Official Website
 Official Fan Club

2008 singles
Dance-pop songs
2008 songs